Dieter Ramusch (born October 31, 1969 in Traundorf bei Globasnitz) is a retired Austria international footballer.

References

1969 births
Living people
Austrian footballers
Austria international footballers
Austria under-21 international footballers
Austrian Football Bundesliga players
FC Kärnten players
SKN St. Pölten players
LASK players
Grazer AK players

Association football defenders